KCKZ may refer to:

 Pennridge Airport (ICAO code KCKZ)
 KCKZ (FM), a radio station (103.5 FM) licensed to serve Huntsville, Missouri, United States